Yunling is the chief town of Yunxiao County, in Zhangzhou, Fujian. It is the seat of Yunxiao's government, Lower People's Court and local branches of CPC and PSB.

Culture & Tourism 
Yunling (called by Chinese convention Zhangpu, 漳浦) lies on the banks of the Zhangjiang River for which the old prefecture Zhangzhou fu and the modern municipality of Zhangzhou are named.

Township-level divisions of Fujian
Zhangzhou